In the United States, child pornography is illegal under federal law and in all states and is punishable by up to 20 years' imprisonment or a fine of $5000. The Supreme Court of the United States has found child pornography to be outside the protections of the First Amendment to the United States Constitution. Federal sentencing guidelines on child pornography differentiate between production, distribution, and purchasing/receiving, and also include variations in severity based on the age of the child involved in the materials, with significant increases in penalties when the offense involves a prepubescent child or a child under the age of 18. U.S. law distinguishes between pornographic images of an actual minor, realistic images that are not of an actual minor, and non-realistic images such as drawings. The latter two categories are legally protected unless found to be obscene, whereas the first does not require a finding of obscenity.

Definition of child pornography under federal law

Child pornography under federal law is defined as any visual depiction of sexually explicit conduct involving a minor (someone under 18 years of age). Visual depictions include photographs, videos, digital or computer generated images indistinguishable from an actual minor, and images created, adapted, or modified, but appear to depict an identifiable, actual minor. Undeveloped film, undeveloped videotape, and electronically stored data that can be converted into a visual image of child pornography are also deemed illegal visual depictions under federal law. The United States Court of Appeals for the Second Circuit has held that images created by superimposing the face of a child on sexually explicit photographs of legal adults is not protected speech under the First Amendment. However, the U.S. Supreme Court ruled that "virtual child pornography" was constitutionally protected speech.

Notably, the age of consent for sexual activity in a given state is irrelevant; any depiction of a minor under 18 years of age engaging in sexually explicit conduct is illegal. Federal prosecutors have secured convictions carrying mandatory minimum sentence of 15 years of imprisonment for producing visual depictions of individuals above the legal age of consent but under the age of 18, even when there was no intent to distribute such content. The legal definition of sexually explicit conduct does not require that an image depict a child engaging in sexual activity. A picture of a naked child may constitute illegal child pornography if it is sufficiently sexually suggestive.

Federal law prohibits the production, distribution, reception, and possession of an image of child pornography using or affecting any means or facility of interstate or foreign commerce (18 U.S.C. § 2251; 18 U.S.C. § 2252; 18 U.S.C. § 2252A). Specifically, Section 2251 makes it illegal to persuade, induce, entice, or coerce a minor to engage in sexually explicit conduct for purposes of producing visual depictions of that conduct. Any individual who attempts or conspires to commit a child pornography offense is also subject to prosecution under federal law.

Federal jurisdiction is implicated if the child pornography offense occurred in interstate or foreign commerce. This includes, for example, using the U.S. Mails or common carriers to transport child pornography across state or international borders. Federal jurisdiction almost always applies when the Internet is used to commit a child pornography violation. Even if the child pornography image itself did not travel across state or international borders, federal law may be implicated if the materials, such as the computer used to download the image or the CD-ROM used to store the image, originated or previously traveled in interstate or foreign commerce.

In addition, Section 2251A of Title 18, United States Code, specifically prohibits any parent, legal guardian, or other person in custody or control of a minor under the age of 18, to buy, sell, or transfer custody of that minor for purposes of producing child pornography.

Lastly, Section 2260 of Title 18, United States Code, prohibits any persons outside of the United States to knowingly produce, receive, transport, ship, or distribute child pornography with intent to import or transmit the visual depiction into the United States.

Consequences of conviction under federal law
Under federal law, finding of guilt on most child pornography related offenses carry severe consequences, such as mandatory minimum sentences of several years and registration as a sex offender.

A first time offender convicted of producing child pornography under 18 U.S.C. § 2251, face fines and a statutory minimum of 15 years to 30 years maximum in prison.

Child pornography offenses for transportation (including mailing or shipping), receipt, distribution, and possession with the intent to distribute or sell child pornography offenses each carry a mandatory minimum term of 5 years of imprisonment and a maximum term of 20 years.

Simple possession of child pornography is punishable by up to 10 years in federal prison, and does not carry a mandatory minimum term of imprisonment. If a defendant has a prior federal or state conviction for one or more enumerated sex offenses, the penalty ranges are enhanced.

Federal sentencing guidelines provide for higher sentences based on the number of images possessed or distributed, whether the victims were 12 years of age or younger, whether the material is "sadistic," and other factors.

Reporting requirements
Under the Crime Victims' Rights Act (CVRA), 46 codified at 18 U.S.C. § 3771, federal law enforcement officials must notify a child pornography victim (or his or her guardian if the victim is still a minor) each time the officials charge an offender with a child pornography offense related to an image depicting the victim. Such notifications can be emotionally traumatic.

Obscenity as a form of unprotected speech

In the United States, pornography is considered a form of personal expression governed by the First Amendment to the United States Constitution. Pornography is generally protected speech, unless it is obscene, as the Supreme Court of the United States held in 1973 in Miller v. California.

Child pornography is also not protected by the First Amendment, but importantly, for different reasons. In 1982 the Supreme Court held in New York v. Ferber that child pornography, even if not obscene, is not protected speech. The court gave a number of justifications why child pornography should not be protected, including that the government has a compelling interest in safeguarding the physical and psychological well-being of minors.

Record-keeping requirements

However, rather than penalties for noncompliance, the statute created a rebuttable presumption that the performer was a minor. Pub. L. 100-690. This version was struck down as unconstitutional under the First Amendment in American Library Association v. Thornburgh, 713 F. Supp. 469 (D.D.C. 1989), vacated as moot, 956 F.2d 1178 (D.C. Cir. 1992).

After Thornburgh, Congress amended 2257 to impose direct criminal penalties for noncompliance with the record-keeping requirements. The same plaintiffs challenged the amended statute and accompanying regulations, but the new version was upheld in American Library Association v. Reno, 33 F.3d 78 (D.C. Cir. 1994).

In Sundance Association, Inc. v. Reno, 139 F.3d 804 (10th Cir. 1998), the Tenth Circuit rejected the regulation's distinction between primary and secondary producers and entirely exempted from the record-keeping requirements those who merely distribute or those whose activity "does not involve hiring, contracting for, managing, or otherwise arranging for the participation of the performers depicted". 18 U.S.C. § 2257(h)(3).

However, after 2257 was amended in 2006 by the Adam Walsh Act, the court ruled that Sundance's restrictions no longer applied to the amended statute and generally ruled in the government's favor on its motion for summary judgment. Free Speech Coalition v. Gonzales, 483 F. Supp. 2d 1069 (D. Colo. 2006).

Simulated pornography

Simulated child pornography was made illegal with the Child Pornography Prevention Act of 1996 (CPPA). The CPPA was short-lived. In 2002, the Supreme Court of the United States in Ashcroft v. Free Speech Coalition held that the relevant portions of the CPPA were unconstitutional because they prevented lawful speech. Referring to Ferber, the court stated that "the CPPA prohibits speech that records no crime and creates no victims by its production. Virtual child pornography is not 'intrinsically related' to the sexual abuse of children".

1466A - Obscene visual representations of the sexual abuse of children

In response to the demise of the CPPA, on April 30, 2003, President George W. Bush signed into law the PROTECT Act of 2003 (also known as the Amber Alert Law).

The law enacted , which criminalizes material that has "a visual depiction of any kind, including a drawing, cartoon, sculpture or painting" that "depicts a minor engaging in sexually explicit conduct and is obscene" or "depicts an image that is, or appears to be, of a minor engaging in ... sexual intercourse ... and lacks serious literary, artistic, political, or scientific value". By its own terms, the law does not make all simulated child pornography illegal, only that found to be obscene or lacking in serious value.

In November 2005 in Richmond, Virginia, Dwight Whorley was convicted under 18 U.S.C. sec. 1466A for using a Virginia Employment Commission computer to receive "obscene Japanese anime cartoons that graphically depicted prepubescent female children being forced to engage in genital-genital and oral-genital intercourse with adult males". He was also convicted of possessing child pornography involving real children. He was sentenced to 20 years in prison.

On December 18, 2008, the Fourth Circuit Court of Appeals affirmed the conviction. The court stated that "it is not a required element of any offense under this section that the minor depicted actually ". Attorneys for Mr. Whorley have said that they will appeal to the Supreme Court.

The request for en banc rehearing of United States v. Whorley from the Court of Appeals was denied on June 15, 2009. A petition for writ of certiorari was filed with the Supreme Court on September 14, 2009, and denied on January 11, 2010, without comment.

Section 2252A
The PROTECT Act also amended , which was part of the original CPPA. The amendment added paragraph (a)(3), which criminalizes knowingly advertising or distributing "an obscene visual depiction of a minor engaging in sexually explicit conduct; or a visual depiction of an actual minor engaging in sexually explicit conduct". The law draws a distinction between obscene depiction of any minor, and mere depiction of an actual minor.

The bill addresses various aspects of child abuse, prohibiting some illustrations and computer-generated images depicting children in a pornographic manner. Provisions against virtual child pornography in the Child Pornography Prevention Act of 1996 were ruled unconstitutional by the U.S. Supreme Court in 2002 on the grounds that the restrictions on speech were not justified by a compelling government interest (such as protecting real children). The provisions of the PROTECT Act instead prohibit such material if it qualifies as obscene as defined by the Miller test; the Supreme Court has ruled that such material is not protected by the First Amendment.

In May 2008, the Supreme Court upheld the 2003 federal law Section 2252A(a)(3)(B) of Title 18, United States Code that criminalizes the pandering and solicitation of child pornography, in a 7–2 ruling penned by Justice Antonin Scalia. The court ruling dismissed the United States Court of Appeals for the 11th Circuit's finding the law unconstitutionally vague. Attorney James R. Marsh, founder of the Children's Law Center in Washington, D.C., wrote that although the Supreme Court's decision has been criticized by some, he believes it correctly enables legal personnel to fight crime networks where child pornography is made and sold.

Further developments

In 1994, the U.S. Court of Appeals for the 3rd Circuit ruled in United States v. Knox that the federal statute contains no requirement that genitals be visible or discernible. The court ruled that non-nude visual depictions can qualify as lascivious exhibitions and that this construction does not render the statute unconstitutionally overbroad.

In 2014, the Supreme Judicial Court of Massachusetts found that certain photos of nude children, culled from ethnographic and nudist publications, were not lascivious exhibitions and hence were not pornographic; the court ordered dropping of charges against a prisoner who had been found in possession of the photos.

In at least one instance, in North Carolina, teenagers in the United States have been prosecuted as adults for possession of images of themselves.

See also
History of child pornography laws in the United States
 Dost Test from United States v. Dost, 636 F. Supp. 828 (S.D. Cal. 1986). 
Legality of child pornography
Child pornography laws in Canada
 Child pornography laws in Australia
 Child pornography laws in the United Kingdom
 Child pornography laws in Portugal
 Child pornography laws in the Netherlands
 Child pornography laws in Japan
 Child pornography in the Philippines

References

External links
Joliet Teens Charged With Child Pornography CBS Chicago, 2015

Child pornography law
United States criminal law by topic
Pedophilia in the United States
Childhood in the United States